Maganti Venkateswara Rao (Babu) is an Indian politician from Andhra Pradesh. He is elected in 2014 Lok Sabha elections from Eluru (Lok Sabha constituency) as Telugu Desam Party candidate. He is well known for his social activities. He initiated supply of drinking water through tankers to villages in Kolleru villages and distributed Tricycles to poor and physically disabled persons. He awarded scholarships to economically backward students and organized medical camps through the MRC trust.

Personal life 
Magantti Venkateswara Rao married Smt. Padmavalli Devi on 18 Feb. 1981. He has two sons (died) and a daughter.

Political career 
Magantti Venkateswara Rao was first elected to the 12th Lok Sabha in 1998 and more recently was re-elected to the 16th Lok Sabha in 2014. At the Lok Sabha, he was a member of the Standing Committee on Agriculture; Consultative Committee, Ministry of Tourism; Standing Committee on External Affairs; Consultative Committee, Ministry of Environment, Forest and Climate Change and the National Social Security Board. He was a member of the Andhra Pradesh Legislative Assembly from 2004 to 2009. He was a Minister with the Government of Andhra Pradesh between 2007 and 2009.

References 

Living people
India MPs 2014–2019
People from Eluru
Telugu Desam Party politicians
India MPs 1998–1999
Lok Sabha members from Andhra Pradesh
1960 births
Telugu politicians